Weblate is a libre web-based translation tool with tight version control integration. It provides two user interfaces, propagation of translations across components, quality checks and automatic linking to source files.

Stated goals 

Weblate aims to facilitate web based translation with tight Git integration for a wide range of file formats, helping translators contribute without knowledge of Git workflow.

Translations closely follow development, as they are hosted within the same repository as the source code.
There is no plan for heavy conflict resolution, as it is argued these should primarily handled on the Git side.

Project name 

The project's name is a portmanteau of words web and translate.

Notable uses 

These are some projects using Weblate:

Godot Engine
 FreePBX
 OsmAnd
 phpMyAdmin
 Unknown Horizons
 OpenPetra 
 Turris Omnia
 Debian Handbook
 LibreOffice
 Monero
 openSUSE
 Open Journal Systems
 H5P
Kodi
 CryptPad

See also 
 Translate Toolkit
 Translation memory
 Computer-assisted translation

References

External links 
 

Software-localization tools
Free software programmed in Python